Ronald Daniel Stewart (born October 11, 1942) is a Canadian politician. He represented the electoral district of Cape Breton North in the Nova Scotia House of Assembly from 1993 to 1997. He was a member of the Nova Scotia Liberal Party.

Early life and education
Stewart was born in North Sydney, Nova Scotia, to father Donald and mother Edith, and raised in Sydney Mines. Stewart graduated with his BA and BSc from Acadia University, and from Dalhousie University in 1970 with his medical degree. During his time as an intern at the VG Hospital he was heavily influenced by his professor and head of Emergency Medicine Dr. Bob Scharf. Upon graduation, he began his medical career by taking up a rural practice in Neil's Harbour, Nova Scotia.

Medical career
In 1972, after two years in Cape Breton, Stewart entered the residency program in Emergency Medicine at the University of Southern California. He was the first medical director in the Los Angeles paramedic program. In Los Angeles, Stewart treated patients like Charles Manson. While working in Los Angeles he was also hired as a consultant for the television shows Emergency! and Marcus Welby, M.D..

In 1978, he left California for Pennsylvania, where he served as the founding head of the emergency medicine department at the University of Pittsburgh. He was appointed medical director for the Department of Public Safety of Pittsburgh, where he was known as "Doctor Emergency".

In 1988, Stewart returned to Canada, first to the University of Toronto and then to Dalhousie University in Halifax, Nova Scotia, to teach and establish a pain and trauma research lab.

Stewart served as the chairman for study of health reform in United States, which advised Bill Clinton, that looked at one phase of ambulatory care and the training standards with regards to emergency care.

Political career
Stewart entered provincial politics in the 1993 election, defeating Progressive Conservative cabinet minister Brian Young by over 1500 votes in the Cape Breton North riding. In June 1993, Stewart was appointed to the Executive Council of Nova Scotia as Minister of Health.

Stewart commissioned several reports on health care reform. Based on these reports, a reform of Nova Scotia's health care system was started in 1994, with the provincial government taking over control of ground ambulance operations and consolidating them into a single entity called Emergency Health Services.

Stewart resigned from cabinet on June 27, 1996, and was replaced by Bernie Boudreau. On September 15, 1997, Stewart resigned as MLA, opening up a seat for premier Russell MacLellan to run in a byelection.

After politics
Stewart founded the Music-in-Medicine program at Dalhousie Medical School, which is part of their Medical Humanities Program. Stewart is currently the Honorary Colonel of 35 (Sydney) Field Ambulance.

Awards and honours
In 1993, Stewart was named an Officer of the Order of Canada. In 2006, he was named a Member of the Order of Nova Scotia. In 2008, Stewart was named a Hero of Emergency Medicine by the American College of Emergency Physicians. Stewart has also received honorary doctorates from Acadia University (DSc-1989), Cape Breton University (LLD-2010) and Dalhousie University (2017)

References 

1942 births
Acadia University alumni
Dalhousie University alumni
Academic staff of the Dalhousie University
Living people
Members of the Executive Council of Nova Scotia
Members of the Order of Nova Scotia
Nova Scotia Liberal Party MLAs
Nova Scotia Ministers of Health
Officers of the Order of Canada
People from the Cape Breton Regional Municipality
Academic staff of the University of Toronto